The 1903 Canadian Amateur Hockey League (CAHL) season was the fifth season of the league. Teams played an eight game schedule. Ottawa and Montreal Victorias tied for the league championship with records of six wins and two losses. Ottawa defeated the Victorias in a two-game playoff to win the season and their first Stanley Cup championship, the first of "Silver Seven" era.

League business

Executive 
 Harry Trihey, Shamrocks (President)
 P. M. Butler, Ottawa (1st Vice-President)
 A. D. Scott, Quebec ( 2nd Vice-President)
 Fred McRobie, Montreal (Secretary-Treasurer)

It was decided that league champions would not play for the Stanley Cup until after the season. If a challenge was ordered by the Cup trustees, Montreal would default the Cup. A challenge was ordered by the trustees and Montreal eventually agreed to play Winnipeg in January during regular season play.

This season saw the loss of several players to hockey leagues in the U.S., including Charlie Liffiton, Hod Stuart, Bruce Stuart, Eddie Hogan and George McCarron.

Season

Highlights 

This season saw several impressive rookies including Frank McGee and Art Moore for Ottawa.

The season would be a two team race between Montreal Victorias and Ottawa, splitting their matches between each other. The season ended in a tie, which necessitated a playoff, won by Ottawa to win their first Stanley Cup. At the other end of the standing, Shamrocks did not win any games.

Final standing

Playoffs 

Ottawa HC and Montreal Victorias played a two-game total-goals series.

Stanley Cup challenges

Winnipeg vs. Montreal 
Another Montreal HC vs. Winnipeg Victorias best-of-three challenge series was held in early 1903. In game one, defending champion Montreal defeated Winnipeg, 8–1. Game two was the first Stanley Cup challenge match to be replayed. Both teams skated to a 2–2 tie before the game had to be suspended at 27:00 of overtime because of a midnight curfew. It was then decided to discard the result and replay the game two days later. In the rescheduled contest, the Victorias won, 4–2, to even the series. However, Montreal won the decisive game three, 4–1, to retain the Cup.

 Spare - Winnipeg Victorias - Dan Bain - C
 Spares - Montreal  - Cecil Blachford - RW, Tom Hodge - D, Charles Liffton - RW, George Smith - RW

 Spare - Winnipeg Victorias - Dan Bain - C
 Spares - Montreal - Billy Bellingham - D, Jimmy Gardner - RW, Charles Liffton - RW, George Smith - RW

 Spare - Winnipeg Victorias - Dan Bain - C
 Spares - Montreal - Billy Bellingham - D, Jimmy Gardner - RW, Charles Liffton - RW, George Smith - RW

 Spare - Winnipeg Victorias - Dan Bain - C
 Spares - Montreal - Cecil Blachford - D, Jimmy Gardner - RW, Tom Hodge - D, Charles Liffton - RW,

Rat Portage vs. Ottawa HC 

Ottawa defeated the Rat Portage Thistles 6–2, 4–2 (10–4) in a two-game, total goals series in Ottawa, March 12–14, 1903.

As the new CAHL and Cup champions, the Ottawas accepted a challenge from the Rat Portage Thistles of the Manitoba & Northwestern Hockey Association (MNWHA). Entering the best-of-three challenge series, the Thistles were younger and quicker than Ottawa; only one player on the Thistles was over the age of 20. Any chance that those factors could have helped the team was negated by soft ice conditions. Ottawa swept the series with scores of 6–2 and 4–2.

For their win, the Ottawa players would each receive a silver nugget. From that point on the team would also be known as the Silver Seven.

Schedule and results 

† Postponed and not played.

Player statistics

Goaltending averages 
Note: GP = Games played, GA = Goals against, SO = Shutouts, GAA = Goals against average

Scoring leaders 
Note: GP = Games played, G = Goals scored

Stanley Cup engravings

1903 Montreal Hockey Club

1903 Ottawa Hockey Club

References

Notes

Bibliography

See also 
 List of Stanley Cup champions

1903
1902–03 in Canadian ice hockey by league